Rattlesnake is a 1995 action film written and directed by Amaka Igwe and produced by Austin Awulonu. It was Amaka Igwe's first foray into making a feature length film and was made in 3 parts. It features Francis Duru, Okechukwu Igwe, Nkem Owoh, Anne Njemanze and Ernest Obi.

Synopsis 
Rattlesnake tells the story of Ahanna Okolo who loses his father under suspicious circumstances as a child and ventures into a life of crime. Following the death of his father, Ahanna's uncle becomes his stepfather as he marries his mother. Ahanna's uncle sends Ahanna and his siblings to the village while he takes over Ahanna's father's property in Lagos. Ahanna ventures into crime and fends for his siblings with the proceeds of his criminal dealings. He goes on to lead a double life as a respectable businessman and an armed robber. He had however become a respectable member of the society when his dealings were exposed.

Cast 

 Francis Duru as young Ahanna Okolo
 Nkem Owoh as Odinaka, Ahanna's uncle
Sunny McDon as Ahanna's father
Ebele Uzochukwu as Ahanna's mother
Anne Njemanze
 Okechukwu Igwe as older Ahanna Okolo
 Ernest Obi as Sango
Julius Agwu as young Peter
 Ejike Methuselah as older Peter
Remy Ohajianya as Peter's father
Bob-Manuel Udokwu
Uche Odoputa
Okey Okoronkwo
Tony One Week
Stella Damasus as Peter's sister
Genevieve Nnaji
Chris Okotie

Production and release 
Rattlesnake is a biographical film which tells the story of a man named Big Fish who was regarded as one of Amaka Igwe's childhood cultural heroes. He was the toast of many until his death when his real story as an armed robber was revealed. It is described as the first Nollywood attempt at making an action film. It was listed as one of the 100 greatest foreign-language films.

The Last Operation was made as a sequel to Rattlesnake.

Remake 
Charles Opaleke of Play Networks Africa obtained the rights to Rattlesnake, made and released the remake titled Rattlesnake: The Ahanna Story in November 2020. In a review by Precious Nwogu of Pulse Nigeria, the remake was said to "pale in comparison to the original in terms of the depth of the original's plot and themes". But despite the storyline criticism, the acting of main character (played by Stan Nze) was critically acclaimed.

References 

Nigerian action drama films